The Ambassador of the United Kingdom to Bulgaria is the United Kingdom's foremost diplomatic representative in Bulgaria, and in charge of the UK's diplomatic mission in Sofia.

Envoy Extraordinary and Minister Plenipotentiary to His Majesty the King of the Bulgarians
1903–1908: Sir George Buchanan
1909–1911: Mansfeldt Findlay
1911–1915: Sir Henry Bax-Ironside
1915–1920: No ambassador due to First World War
1920–1921: Sir Arthur Peel
1921–1928: Sir William Erskine
1928–1929: Rowland Sperling
1929–1933: Sydney Waterlow
1933–1936: Charles Bentinck
1936–1938: Maurice Peterson
1938–1941: George Rendel
1941–1946: No ambassador due to Second World War

Envoy Extraordinary and Minister Plenipotentiary at Sofia
1947–1949: John Sterndale Bennett
1949–1951: Paul Mason
1951–1954: John Carvell
1954–1956: Geoffrey Furlonge
1956–1958: Richard Speaight
1958–1960: Anthony Lambert
1960–1963: Anthony Lincoln

Ambassador Extraordinary and Plenipotentiary at Sofia
1964–1966: William Harpham
1966–1970: Desmond Crawley
1970–1973: Donald Logan
1973–1976: Edwin Bolland
1976–1980: John Cloake
1980–1983: Giles Bullard
1983–1986: John Snodgrass
1986–1989: John Fawcett
1989–1994: Richard Thomas
1994–1998: Roger Short
1998–2001: Richard Stagg
2001–2003: Ian Soutar
2004–2007: Jeremy Hill
2007–2011: Steve Williams
2011–2015: Jonathan Allen
2015–August 2020: Emma Hopkins

August 2020–: Rob Dixon

References

External links
UK in Bulgaria, gov.uk

Bulgaria
 
United Kingdom